Chocolate Lizards is an upcoming American comedy-drama film directed by Mark Lambert Bristol, and starring Thomas Haden Church, Carrie-Anne Moss, Rudy Pankow, Bruce Dern and Julio Cesar Cedillo.  It is based on the 1999 novel of the same name by Cole Thompson.

Cast
Thomas Haden Church as Merle Luskey
Carrie-Anne Moss as Faye
Rudy Pankow as Erwin Vandeveer
Bruce Dern as Scheermeyer
Julio Cesar Cedilloas Sheriff Nall

Production
Filming began in Austin, Texas on October 13, 2021.  Filming also occurred in Bartlett, Texas in October 2021.

References

External links
 

Upcoming films
American comedy-drama films
Films shot in Texas